Protein FAM13A is a protein that in humans is encoded by the FAM13A gene.

References

Further reading

External links